The Greatest Hits Collection is the first greatest hits compilation album by American country music artist Alan Jackson. Released on October 24, 1995, it includes the greatest hits from his first four studio albums, as well as an album cut from his 1990 debut Here in the Real World and two new tracks — "Tall, Tall Trees" and "I'll Try", both of which were Number One hits for him on the Billboard Hot Country Songs.

The Greatest Hits Collection   peaked  at #5 on the U.S. Billboard 200 Albums Chart and #1 on the Top Country Albums Chart, becoming Alan Jackson's third #1 country album. In October 2006, the album was certified 6× Platinum by the RIAA.

Content
The Greatest Hits Collection reprises all of Jackson's greatest hits from his first four studio albums. "Here in the Real World", "Wanted", "Chasin' That Neon Rainbow" and "I'd Love You All Over Again" from 1990's Here in the Real World; "Don't Rock the Jukebox", "Someday", "Dallas", "Midnight in Montgomery" and "Love's Got a Hold on You" from 1991's Don't Rock the Jukebox; "She's Got the Rhythm (And I Got the Blues)", "Chattahoochee", "Mercury Blues" and "Who Says You Can't Have It All" from 1992's A Lot About Livin' (And a Little 'bout Love), and "Summertime Blues", "Livin' on Love", "Gone Country" and "I Don't Even Know Your Name" from 1994's Who I Am. The only singles not included on this collection are "Blue Blooded Woman" from Here in the Real World, "Tonight I Climbed the Wall" from A Lot About Livin' (And a Little 'bout Love), and "Song for the Life" from Who I Am.

Two previously unreleased songs are included on this compilation as well. "Tall, Tall Trees", originally recorded by George Jones on his 1958 album Long Live King George, and the newly written "I'll Try". Both of these were released as singles, reaching the top of the Billboard country charts in late 1995 and early 1996, respectively. One song on this compilation, "Home", was previously included on Here in the Real World but was not released as a single until mid-1996, peaking at #3 on the country charts.

Track listing

APreviously unreleased

Personnel
Tracks 5, 7 & 13 only.
Eddie Bayers – drums 
Jimmy Capps – acoustic guitar (13)
Stuart Duncan – fiddle (5, 7)
Paul Franklin – steel guitar 
Steve Gibson – electric guitar (13)
Rob Hajacos – fiddle (13)
Dennis Henson – background vocals (13)
Roy Huskey Jr. – upright bass (5)
Brent Mason – electric guitar (5, 7)
Larry Paxton – bass guitar (13)
Hargus "Pig" Robbins – piano 
John Wesley Ryles – background vocals (5, 7)
Jo-El Sonnier – accordion (5)
Bruce Watkins – acoustic guitar (5, 7)
Glenn Worf – bass guitar (5, 7)

Charts

Weekly charts

Year-end charts

Certifications

References

1995 greatest hits albums
Alan Jackson compilation albums
Arista Records compilation albums
Albums produced by Keith Stegall